Yeo Lake is an ephemeral salt lake in the south of Western Australia, lying in the Great Victoria Desert east of Cosmo Newberry. The Anne Beadell Highway runs along its southern margin, and the Great Central Road lies further to its north. Its surface elevation is 349 metres above mean sea-level.

Nature reserve
The Yeo Lake Nature Reserve is set aside for biological diversity in semi-arid and arid areas of Australia, and camping is permitted. The reserve covers the entire lake system.

See also
 Cosmo Newberry

References

Saline lakes of Western Australia
Lakes of Goldfields-Esperance (Western Australia)